James Beck (1929–1973) was an English actor. 

James or Jim Beck may also refer to:

 James Beck (art historian) (1930–2007), American art historian specializing in the Italian Renaissance
 James B. Beck (1822–1890), American congressman from Kentucky
 James M. Beck (1861–1936), American politician and author from Pennsylvania
 James M. Beck Jr. (1892–1972) American soldier, businessman and society figure 
 James Garfield Beck, American educator, coach, postal clerk, socialite, and community leader
 Jim Beck (record producer)
 Jim Beck (politician)